Lyari Town is named after the historic locality of Lyari. Lyari Town was the smallest borough (called "town" in Karachi) by area, but also the most densely populated one. Lyari Town was formed in 2001 as part of The Local Government Ordinance 2001, and was subdivided into 11 Union councils. The town system was disbanded in 2011, and Lyari Town was re-organized as part of Karachi South in 2015.

Location 
It was bordered by the boroughs of SITE Town to the north across the Lyari River, Jamshed Town and Saddar Town to the east, and Kemari Town to the west across Karachi Harbour. It was made 11 smaller localities, called union councils, which were in turn divided into several neighborhoods.

History

2000 
The federal government introduced local government reforms in the year 2000, which eliminated the previous "third tier of government" (administrative divisions) and replaced it with the fourth tier (districts). The effect in Karachi was the dissolution of the former Karachi Division, and the merging of its five districts to form a new Karachi City-District with eighteen autonomous constituent towns including Lyari Town.

2011 
In 2011, the system was disbanded but remained in place for bureaucratic administration until 2015, when the Karachi Metropolitan Corporation system was reintroduced.

2015 
In 2015, Lyari Town was re-organized as part of Karachi South district.

See also
 Lyari Development Authority
 Lyari Expressway
 Lyari River
 Lyari
 Lyari Expressway Resettlement Project

References

Bibliography
Sources

External links 
 Imagining Lyari through Akhtar Soomro
 Town map
 Official Website

 
Karachi South District
Towns in Karachi